Cherlapally Central Jail is a correctional facility in Cherlapally, Hyderabad, Telangana, India.

Infrastructure 
Cherlapally Central Jail is located in an area spread across . It employs prisoners in agricultural, dairy activities etc. The jail also houses a 15-20 acre vegetable farm, dairy farm and a 20 acres mango orchard. The produce from these facilities not just serves the requirements of the prison, but also is used for other prisons in the city.

References 

Prisons in Hyderabad, India
Year of establishment missing